Namesake is an album led by trumpeter Dennis González which was recorded in 1987 and released on the Swedish Silkheart label.

Reception 

Comparing it with González previous album, The Penguin Guide to Jazz notes "Namesake only suffers by comparison, but it shouldn't be missed". In his review for AllMusic, Brian Olewnick states "Namesake doesn't really happen, and it's hard to pinpoint exactly why – the all-Gonzalez-originals are essentially heads to set up solos rather than fully fleshed-out ensemble passages. And while those solos are almost all strong, the music resolutely remains less than the sum of the parts".

Track listing 
All compositions by Dennis González except where noted.
 "Namesake" – 15:46
 "The Separation of Stones" – 9:15
 "Johnny – Johnny" – 8:14 Bonus track on CD
 "Hamba Khale Qhawe" – 1:35
 "Four Pigs and a Bird's Nest" (James Sharper, Dennis González) – 5:37
 "Hymn for Mbizo" – 11:53
 "Good Friends" – 5:30

Personnel 
Dennis González – trumpet, pocket trumpet, flugelhorn, pao de chuva, Pakistani bells, kalimba, vocals
Ahmed Abdullah – trumpet, fluegelhorn, balafon
Douglas Ewart – bass clarinet, alto saxophone
Charles Brackeen – tenor saxophone, congas
Malachi Favors – bass, vocals
Alvin Fielder – drums, percussion

References 

1987 albums
Dennis González albums
Silkheart Records albums